Angleton may refer to:

Angleton family
Doris Angleton (1951–1997), American socialite and murder victim from Texas
Robert Angleton (b. 1948), American bookmaker; exonerated of the murder of his wife
Roger Angleton (1942–1998), American murderer

Other uses
Angleton, Texas, U.S.
Angleton High School
James Jesus Angleton (1917–1987), American CIA official
Angleton Iron Works, a scheduled monument in Coity Higher, Bridgend County Borough, Wales